The Land Charges Act 1972 is a UK Act of Parliament that updates the system for registering charges on unregistered land in England and Wales. It repealed and updated parts of the Land Charges Act 1925 and other legislation affecting real property.

Background
In the early 20th century, a package of reforms were made to register land in England and Wales to make conveyancing cheaper and simpler, and free land to the market. The main legislation was the Land Registration Act 1925, the Law of Property Act 1925, the Trustee Act 1925, and the Settled Land Act 1925. However, much land was to remain unregistered. Instead, for that land not yet registered, people could choose to explicitly register interests under the Land Charges Act 1925, and so get better protection than the common law might provide against a bona fide purchaser without notice of any equitable interest sought to be protected. In 1972, this Act was updated into the present scheme.

Content

See also
English land law

United Kingdom Acts of Parliament 1972
English property law
Acts of the Parliament of the United Kingdom concerning England and Wales
Housing legislation in the United Kingdom